Montrose is a rural locality in the Southern Downs Region, Queensland, Australia.

History 
The locality takes its name from a railway station, which in turn came from a pastoral run, named by pastoralist St George Richard Gore after the town of Montrose in Forfarshire, Scotland.

References 

Southern Downs Region
Localities in Queensland